Kathleen Flake is a historian, writer, and attorney and is currently the Richard Lyman Bushman Chair of Mormon studies at the University of Virginia.

Education
Flake obtained a BA from Brigham Young University, an MA from Catholic University of America, a law degree from the University of Utah, and a PhD from the University of Chicago.

Career
Flake was previously a professor of American religious history at the Divinity School and Graduate Department of Religion at Vanderbilt University. While a graduate student Flake took a summer seminar course for graduate students on Mormon History with Richard L. Bushman.

Flake's research in the area of American religious history focuses on the adaptive strategies of 19th and 20th century American religious communities and the effect of pluralism on religious identity. She also studies constructive function of text and ritual in maintaining and adapting the identity and gendered power structures of religious communities. Flake studies the influence of American law on American religion and the theological tensions inherent in the First Amendment religious clauses.

Personal life
Flake is a member of the Church of Jesus Christ of Latter-day Saints and served a mission in Japan. She is a distant relative to former U.S. Senator Jeff Flake of Arizona; they share a great-grandfather, William J. Flake.

She lives in Charlottesville, Virginia.

Works
Books
 

Book chapters
 
 
 

Journal articles

Further reading

References

External links
Kathleen Flake Official Website
University of Virginia Official Profile

Living people
American historians of religion
Brigham Young University alumni
University of Utah alumni
American lawyers
American women lawyers
Catholic University of America alumni
University of Chicago alumni
Vanderbilt University faculty
Latter Day Saints from Tennessee
Female Mormon missionaries
American Mormon missionaries in Japan
Historians of the Latter Day Saint movement
American women historians
Latter Day Saints from Virginia
Year of birth missing (living people)